Horatio is an unincorporated community in the High Hills of Santee area in western Sumter County, South Carolina, United States.

It lies on Horatio Road west of South Carolina Highway 261 north of Stateburg and is the location of the Lenoir Store, which is listed on the National Register of Historic Places. The Horatio post office, zip code 29168, is located inside the Lenoir Store at 3240 Horatio Road. The community was originally called Louellen, but was renamed Horatio for Horatio Lenoir.

Notable person
Sloman Moody

References

External links 
 South Carolina Department of Archives and History file on Lenoir Store
 Names in Sumter District
 Map of Sumter County
 Another map of Sumter County
 Topo Map of Horatio

Unincorporated communities in South Carolina
Unincorporated communities in Sumter County, South Carolina